Robert Scarborough may refer to:

 Robert B. Scarborough (1861–1927), U.S. Representative from South Carolina
 Robert H. Scarborough (1923–2020), U.S. Coast Guard admiral